Haruni may refer to:
 Haruni, Chaharmahal and Bakhtiari
 Haruni, Yazd